Alicyn Packard is an American voice actress, writer and retired stand up comedian nominated for a 2014 Voice Arts Award. As of 2004-2005, she provided the voice of Bulb from Disney Channel's Magnet-Tude. She also voices the characters Little Miss Sunshine, Little Miss Naughty, and Little Miss Whoops on the Cartoon Network animated series The Mr. Men Show. She also stars as Cadet Robyn on the Sprout network show Space Racers and as Alma on the Sprout network show The Extraordinary Adventures of Poppy Cat and wrote an episode of the show's second season. She plays Toodles on The Tom and Jerry Show, and Connor and Caitlin on Olivia. She also played Jibanyan on Yo-kai Watch.

Ms. Packard is the voice of the female blood elf in the video game World of Warcraft. She has also voiced Pericci in Star Ocean: The First Departure and the characters of Luce Valenci and Altyria Jono in Vandal Hearts: Flames of Judgment.

Early life
Packard was raised in Hanson, Massachusetts, and began her career in nearby Boston. She later attended Emerson College, earning a Bachelor of Arts in Visual Media Arts with a concentration in New Media. At Emerson she was a DJ at WERS, the college's radio station which at the time was the nation's #1 college radio station in the nation (17). At WERS she created the electronic music program Revolutions which she co-hosted with the Grammy-nominated producer Morgan Page.

Career
Packard's work at WERS brought her to the attention of local casting directors and she soon began her voice over career in local radio commercials and promos. She then worked at publisher Prentice-Hall as the voice of their e-learning textbooks. She moved to Los Angeles to complete her degree through Emerson College Los Angeles Program.

Filmography
Animation

Anime 

Anime Film

Live-action 

Video games

References

External links 

 Official Website (www.alicynpackard.com) 
 

Living people
Actresses from Massachusetts
American video game actresses
American voice actresses
Emerson College alumni
Year of birth unknown
20th-century American actresses
21st-century American actresses
Year of birth missing (living people)